The 2000 NBA playoffs was the postseason tournament of the National Basketball Association's 1999–2000 season. The tournament concluded with the Western Conference champion Los Angeles Lakers defeating the Eastern Conference champion Indiana Pacers four games to two. Shaquille O'Neal was named NBA Finals MVP.

This was also the first NBA postseason to not have any back-to-backs at all. (After 1988, they were still used in the conference semifinals.)

Overview
The San Antonio Spurs were the champions going into the playoffs, but following a season-ending injury to third-year star Tim Duncan, were eliminated by the Phoenix Suns in the first round, marking the first time since 1987 that a new champion would follow a team enjoying a single season championship tenure. They were also the first defending champion to be eliminated in the first round since the Philadelphia 76ers in 1984.

The Houston Rockets missed the playoffs for the first time since 1992, while the Seattle SuperSonics returned after a one season absence.

The Toronto Raptors made their NBA playoff debut, becoming the first Canadian team to do so. As such, Game 3 of their first round series against the New York Knicks was the first NBA Playoff game ever played outside the United States.

For the first time in franchise history, the Miami Heat swept a playoff opponent by beating the Detroit Pistons 3-0. It was also their first playoff series victory since 1997, when they made the Conference Finals.

Game 4 of the Trail Blazers-Timberwolves series was Malik Sealy’s final NBA Game. He would lose his life in a drunk driving crash on May 20th, after attending Kevin Garnett’s birthday party.

In the conference semifinals, the Miami Heat and New York Knicks met for the fourth consecutive postseason. They would not meet again in the playoffs until 2012.

With their conference semifinals victory over the Utah Jazz, The Portland Trail Blazers advanced to their second consecutive Western Conference Finals. The Trail Blazers would not win another playoff series until 2014.

With a Game 7 win in the conference semifinals, the New York Knicks eliminated the Miami Heat for the third consecutive postseason. The Knicks would not win another playoff series until 2013.

In the Western Conference Finals, the Los Angeles Lakers took a 3-1 series lead, only for the Portland Trail Blazers to force a Game 7. By doing so, the Trail Blazers became the first team since 1981 to force a Game 7 in the Conference Finals despite trailing 3-1.

With their Eastern Conference Finals victory over the New York Knicks, the Indiana Pacers won their first Eastern Conference title after four previous appearances in the Eastern Conference Finals; however, after this season, the team was radically altered with key players Dale Davis, Derrick McKey and Mark Jackson moving to other teams and Rik Smits retiring. Game 6 of the Eastern Conference Finals was the last game Patrick Ewing ever played as a Knick. The Pacers would not win another playoff series until 2004.

In Game 7 of the Western Conference Finals, the Los Angeles Lakers used an 15-0 fourth quarter run to overcome a fifteen point deficit to defeat the Portland Trail Blazers and make their first NBA Finals since 1991. With the win, the Lakers also avoided the dubious distinction of becoming the seventh team in NBA History to lose a playoff series despite leading 3-1.

The Lakers' NBA Finals win over the Indiana Pacers was the first title for both Shaquille O'Neal and Kobe Bryant, and the first Lakers championship since the 1988 NBA Finals. A. C. Green, the only player left from the Lakers' Showtime era, was in the Lakers starting lineup for this series as well.

Playoff qualifying

Eastern Conference
The following teams clinched a playoff berth in the East:

Indiana Pacers (56–26, clinched Central division and home court advantage for the Eastern Conference playoffs)
Miami Heat (52–30, clinched Atlantic division)
New York Knicks (50–32)
Charlotte Hornets (49–33)
Philadelphia 76ers (49–33)
Toronto Raptors (45–37)
Detroit Pistons (42–40)
Milwaukee Bucks (42–40)

Western Conference
The following teams clinched a playoff berth in the West:
Los Angeles clippers  
Los Angeles Lakers (67–15, clinched Pacific division title and home court advantage throughout the playoffs)
Utah Jazz (55–27, clinched Midwest division)
Portland Trail Blazers (59–23)
San Antonio Spurs (53–29)
Phoenix Suns (53–29)
Minnesota Timberwolves (50–32)
Seattle SuperSonics (45–37)
Sacramento Kings (44-38)

Bracket
This was the outlook for the playoffs. Teams in italics have home court advantage. Teams in bold advance to the next round. Numbers to the left of each team indicate the team's original playoffs seeding in their respective conferences. Numbers to the right of each team indicate the number of games the team won in that round. The division champions possess an asterisk (*)

First round

Eastern Conference first round

(1) Indiana Pacers vs. (8) Milwaukee Bucks

In Game 5, Travis Best hits the eventual series-winning 3 with 16.5 left. Also Reggie Miller scores 18 points in the 4th quarter of game 5.

This was the second playoff meeting between these two teams, with the Pacers winning the first meeting.

(2) Miami Heat vs. (7) Detroit Pistons

This was the first playoff meeting between the Pistons and the Heat.

(3) New York Knicks vs. (6) Toronto Raptors

In Game 2, Latrell Sprewell hits the game-winner with 7.9 left.

This was the first playoff meeting between the Knicks and the Raptors.

(4) Charlotte Hornets vs. (5) Philadelphia 76ers

This was the first playoff meeting between the 76ers and the Charlotte Hornets.

Western Conference first round

(1) Los Angeles Lakers vs. (8) Sacramento Kings

Shaquille O'Neal scores playoff career-high 46 points in Game One.
Kobe Bryant scores playoff career-high 32 points in Game Two.
Bryant scores a new career-high 35 points in Game Three.

This was the eighth playoff meeting between these two teams, with the Lakers winning six of the first seven meetings.

(2) Utah Jazz vs. (7) Seattle SuperSonics

This was the fourth playoff meeting between these two teams, with the SuperSonics winning two of the first three meetings.

(3) Portland Trail Blazers vs. (6) Minnesota Timberwolves

This was the first playoff meeting between the Timberwolves and the Trail Blazers.

(4) San Antonio Spurs vs. (5) Phoenix Suns

This was the fifth playoff meeting between these two teams, with each team winning two series apiece.

Conference semifinals

Eastern Conference semifinals

(1) Indiana Pacers vs. (5) Philadelphia 76ers

This was the third playoff meeting between these two teams, with each team winning one series apiece.

(2) Miami Heat vs. (3) New York Knicks

This was the fourth playoff meeting between these two teams, with the Knicks winning two of the first three meetings.

Western Conference semifinals

(1) Los Angeles Lakers vs. (5) Phoenix Suns

Kobe Bryant hits the game-winner with 2.6 seconds left in Game 2.

This was the ninth playoff meeting between these two teams, with the Lakers winning six of the first eight meetings.

(2) Utah Jazz vs. (3) Portland Trail Blazers

In Game 5, Scottie Pippen hits the series-winning 3 with 7.3 seconds left. Game 5 is Jeff Hornacek's final NBA game.

This was the sixth playoff meeting between these two teams, with the Trail Blazers winning three of the first five meetings.

Conference finals

Eastern Conference finals

(1) Indiana Pacers vs. (3) New York Knicks

In Game 6, Reggie Miller scores 17 points in the 4th quarter to help the Pacers reach the NBA Finals. It was also Patrick Ewing's last Knicks game before being dealt to the defunct Seattle Supersonics during the off-season.

This was the sixth playoff meeting between these two teams, with the Knicks winning three of the first five meetings.

Western Conference finals

(1) Los Angeles Lakers vs. (3) Portland Trail Blazers

In Game 3, Arvydas Sabonis' potential game-tying shot was blocked by Kobe Bryant.
In Game 7, the Lakers overcame a 16-point deficit (71-55) and sealed the victory with Kobe Bryant delivering an alley-oop to Shaquille O'Neal.

This was the ninth playoff meeting between these two teams, with the Lakers winning six of the first eight meetings.

NBA Finals: (W1) Los Angeles Lakers vs. (E1) Indiana Pacers

In Game 4, Kobe Bryant came back from his injury from Game 2 and after his teammate, Shaquille O'Neal fouled out of the game in OT, he took over the game. He followed in a missed shot by Brian Shaw with 5.9 seconds left to give the Lakers a 3-point lead, and after a potential game-winning three by Reggie Miller bounced off the rim, the Lakers took a 3-1 series lead. 
Game 6 is Rik Smits final NBA game.

This was the first playoff meeting between the Pacers and the Lakers.

References

External links
CNNSI.com's 2000 Playoffs coverage

National Basketball Association playoffs
Playoffs
Sports in Portland, Oregon

fi:NBA-kausi 1999–2000#Pudotuspelit